DeShaun Dupree Holton (October 2, 1973 – April 11, 2006), known professionally as Proof, was an American rapper from Detroit, Michigan. During his career, he was a member of the groups 5 Elementz, Funky Cowboys, Promatic, Goon Sqwad, and D12. He was a close childhood friend of rapper Eminem, who also lived in Detroit. Proof was often a hype man at Eminem's concerts.

Early life 
DeShaun Dupree Holton was born to Sharallene "Pepper" Holton, a single mother. His father, McKinley Jackson, was a music producer who left to pursue his career prior to Holton's birth. DeShaun was close friends with Eminem from a young age.

Career 

Originally known as Maximum, under the moniker "Proof", Holton first rose to national prominence when he formed D12 "The Dirty Dozen" in 1995 with his friends Eminem, Bizarre, Mr. Porter, and a high school friend Eye-Kyu. Shortly after that, Proof recruited two friends, B-Flat & Dirty Ratt, to the group. This created the first lineup of Proof's supergroup D12. Eventually this first incarnation of the group back in early 1996 because the original members of D12, Eye-Kyu, B-Flat, and Dirty Ratt, were more focused on recording music with their other groups. Bizarre, Denaun, and Eminem, could not make it to the studio sessions because they were also working with their other groups. Proof decided to break up this version of the group in 1996. Proof later reformed the group in mid-1996. This time Proof called Bizarre and Eminem, since they were available. He also asked Denaun, who said he would not return to the group unless they recruit an affiliate and friend of the group, Kuniva. Proof allowed Denaun to put Kuniva in the group since all the members at the time were already friends with Kuniva . Then Bizarre decided one of Proof's friends, who was a rapper (from 6th Mile, Detroit) named MC Bugz, should be in the group. Bugz was also a childhood friend of B-Flat and Dirty Ratt, who had previously parted ways with D12. Early individual accomplishments included being featured in The Source's "Unsigned Hype" column in 1999 and nearly winning the 1998 Blaze Battle. His first television appearance was in the video for Aaliyah's "Age Ain't Nothing But a Number".

In 2000, Proof toured with Eminem, Dr. Dre, Ice Cube, and Snoop Dogg in the Up In Smoke Tour, performing as a hype man for Eminem. He gained further exposure in 2001 with the release of Devil's Night, D12's debut album on Interscope Records. The following year, Proof collaborated with Dogmatic on "Promatic" and joined Eminem's "Anger Management" tour in support of the release. He appeared in the film 8 Mile along with Eminem and Xzibit. Proof appeared as Lil' Tic, a freestyle rapper who rap battles the lead character, B-Rabbit, played by Eminem. To capitalize on the publicity from the film, Proof released a six-song EP called Electric CoolAid Acid Testing. Proof also starred in a cameo role, alongside the rest of D12 (except for Eminem), in The Longest Yard, appearing as "Basketball Convicts" during the credits.

Solo work 
Proof released a solo album featuring collaborations with 50 Cent, Method Man, Nate Dogg, B-Real of Cypress Hill, T3 of Slum Village, Obie Trice, King Gordy, Eminem and D12. Proof said that he did not produce the record with Shady Records or Aftermath because he wanted to "build his own thing". Called Searching for Jerry Garcia, the album was released on August 9, 2005, on his own Iron Fist Records label in conjunction with Alliance Entertainment's IDN Distribution, ten years to the day following Grateful Dead frontman Jerry Garcia's death. It contained the prophetic song Kurt Kobain in which he wrote of his own death and 'passing the sign' to 1st Born as his protégé once he was gone. Proof has said that he considered Garcia to be a "genius" who suffered from common character flaws. Proof has stated his admiration for Garcia's eclectic style, saying that Garcia "went against the grain". Proof stated how he wanted to be remembered in an interview with SOHH.com shortly after his album release: "I want people to say that I was a true artist, that I did it best and stayed true to Hip Hop roots [...] I'd want people to understand I did it for the love, not for the charts." The album received favorable reviews, which commented on its "eclectic" and "introspective" nature. Despite its list of guest appearances and favorable reviews, the release did not make a significant impact on the charts.
Proof also recorded a track, "How I Live," with Twiztid for their album Independents Day shortly before his death. Besides these, he recorded during his Gold Coast tour in 2006, which was exactly two weeks before his death, a song with "Liquidsilva" from Australia.

At the time of Proof's death, he wrote and recorded what would have been his third album called Time a Tell with DJ Jewels Baby in a span of twenty-four hours. The album was later released on DatPiff in 2010 as a mixtape.

Shooting and death 
On April 11, 2006, Proof was shot three times by Mario Etheridge, once in the head and twice in the chest, after a dispute broke out during a game of billiards at the CCC Club on 8 Mile Road in Detroit. A pool game between Proof and Keith Bender turned into a heated argument and then escalated into a physical altercation. Etheridge, who was Bender's cousin, fired a warning shot into the air. There have been many conflicting reports about Proof and Keith Bender's roles in the shooting, but it was reported that Proof then shot Bender in the head during the altercation. Bender was not immediately killed by the gunshot but died a week later from his injuries. In response to Proof shooting Bender, Etheridge then shot Proof three times, once in the head and twice in the chest, killing him at the scene. At the time of his death, Proof's blood alcohol content was 0.32. Proof's lawyer, David Gorosh, accused the police and the media of being "reckless" for suggesting that his client fired the first shots without having any hard evidence. A few weeks after both men's death, Bender's family began a wrongful death suit against Proof's estate. Authorities determined that Etheridge was acting lawfully in defense of another; however, he was found guilty of carrying a concealed weapon and discharging a firearm inside of a building.

On April 19, 2006, a service for Proof was held in the Fellowship Chapel in Detroit to a full house of 2,660 people, including life-long friends Eminem, Royce Da 5'9, 50 Cent, and thousands more mourning outside. He was then buried in Woodlawn Cemetery.

Aftermath 
Seven months after Proof's death, his close friend Reginald "Mudd" Moore, who was with him at the nightclub where he was killed, gave an exclusive interview with XXL magazine where he told a different account of what happened that night. In Mudd's version of the events, Proof is portrayed neither as the instigator nor a cold-blooded killer. According to Mudd, the night started out with him and Proof and two of their friends barhopping. They arrived at the Triple C club at around 3:55am, where a fight between Keith Bender and Proof escalated over a pool game. The bouncer Mario Etheridge then pulled out his gun and fired two shots into the air to break the fight up, but instead the shots caused panic. Mudd went on to state that an intoxicated Proof pushed him out of the way, reached for his gun and fired once into the air. Keith Bender then came from behind and started attacking Proof, trying to get the weapon out of his hand. Etheridge then came over and started shooting in the direction of Proof and Bender, killing both men.

Legacy 
In 2008, Welsh singer/songwriter Jem dedicated the song "You Will Make It" to the memory of Proof (listed under his birth name DeShaun Holton) on her second album Down to Earth. In the liner notes, she said "For your families and friends and for all those who experienced the tragedy of sudden loss". In early 2009, Jem revealed "The track is about losing someone and I wrote it the day after his friend Proof was murdered. I was in Detroit with Eminem's friends, who I happened to be recording with, when it happened". Eminem eulogized his friend with the unreleased track "Difficult", which leaked to the public in 2010. Eminem further eulogized Proof on Recovery with "You're Never Over". Eminem has since mentioned Proof in a number of songs, including "Going Through Changes","Cinderella Man", "Deja Vu", "Walk on Water", "Believe", "Arose", "Stepping Stone", "Venom", Killer (Remix) and "Zeus".

Discography 

Anywhere EP (1996)
Electric Coolaid Acid Testing EP (2002)
I Miss the Hip Hop Shop (2004)
Searching for Jerry Garcia (2005)

With D12
The Underground EP (1997)
Devil's Night (2001)
D12 World (2004)

With Funky Cowboys
Livin' Proof: Funky Cowboys Vol 1 (2017) (Recorded in 1996)
Livin' Proof: Funky Cowboys Vol 2 (2018) (Recorded in 1996/1997)

Filmography

Videography 
 "Age Ain't Nothing But a Number" (1995), extra
 "The Real Slim Shady" (2000), extra
 "Shit on You" (2000)
 "Purple Hills" (2001)
 "Fight Music" (2001)
 "Rap Name" – Obie Trice (2002), extra
 "Superman" – Eminem (2002) extra
 "In Da Club" – 50 Cent (2003) extra
 "Git Up" (2004)
 "My Band" (2004)
 "40 Oz" (2004)
 "How Come" (2004)
 "U R the One" (2004)
 "Like Toy Soldiers" (2005) – acting as Bugz
 "Mockingbird" (2005) – Archive footage
 "Punk'd" Season 4, Episode 8 (2005)
 "Ass Like That" – Eminem (2005)
 "Rockstar" – Bizarre (2005)
 "Welcome 2 Detroit" (2005), extra
 "Gurls Wit Da Boom" (2005)
 "Walk on Water" (2017) - Archive footage

See also 
List of murdered hip hop musicians
 List of homicides in Michigan

References

Further reading

External links 

 

1973 births
2006 deaths
2006 murders in the United States
Midwest hip hop musicians
African-American male rappers
Deaths by firearm in Michigan
Rappers from Detroit
Shady Records artists
Eminem
Songwriters from Michigan
People murdered in Michigan
Murdered African-American people
Burials at Woodlawn Cemetery (Detroit)
D12 members
20th-century American rappers
21st-century American rappers
African-American songwriters
20th-century American male musicians